The Alexander Smith House, also known as Twenty-four Trees,  is a property in Brentwood, Tennessee that was listed on the National Register of Historic Places in 2005.

It was built or has other significance in c.1800, 1812, and 1920. It includes I-house and other architecture.

The property was included in a 1988 study of Williamson County historical resources.

References

Houses on the National Register of Historic Places in Tennessee
Houses in Williamson County, Tennessee
Colonial Revival architecture in Tennessee
I-houses in Tennessee
Houses completed in 1800
National Register of Historic Places in Williamson County, Tennessee